Computation is any type of arithmetic or non-arithmetic calculation that follows a well-defined model (e.g., an algorithm).

Mechanical or electronic devices (or, historically, people) that perform computations are known as computers. An especially well-known discipline of the study of computation is computer science.

Physical process of computation 
Computation can be seen as a purely physical process occurring inside a closed physical system called a computer. Examples of such physical systems are digital computers, mechanical computers, quantum computers, DNA computers, molecular computers, microfluidics-based computers, analog computers, and wetware computers.

This point of view has been adopted by the physics of computation, a branch of theoretical physics, as well as the field of natural computing.

An even more radical point of view, pancomputationalism, is the postulate of digital physics that argues that the evolution of the universe is itself a computation.

The mapping account 
The classic account of computation is found throughout the works of Hilary Putnam and others. Peter Godfrey-Smith has dubbed this the "simple mapping account." Gualtiero Piccinini's summary of this account states that a physical system can be said to perform a specific computation when there is a mapping between the state of that system and the computation such that the "microphysical states [of the system] mirror the state transitions between the computational states."

The semantic account 
Philosophers such as Jerry Fodor have suggested various accounts of computation with the restriction that semantic content be a necessary condition for computation (that is, what differentiates an arbitrary physical system from a computing system is that the operands of the computation represent something).  This notion attempts to prevent the logical abstraction of the mapping account of pancomputationalism, the idea that everything can be said to be computing everything.

The mechanistic account 
Gualtiero Piccinini proposes an account of computation based on mechanical philosophy. It states that physical computing systems are types of mechanisms that, by design, perform physical computation, or the manipulation (by a functional mechanism) of a "medium-independent" vehicle according to a rule. "Medium-independence" requires that the property can be instantiated by multiple realizers and multiple mechanisms, and that the inputs and outputs of the mechanism also be multiply realizable. In short, medium-independence allows for the use of physical variables with properties other than voltage (as in typical digital computers); this is imperative in considering other types of computation, such as that which occurs in the brain or in a quantum computer. A rule, in this sense, provides a mapping among inputs, outputs, and internal states of the physical computing system.

Mathematical models 

In the theory of computation, a diversity of mathematical models of computation has been developed.
Typical mathematical models of computers are the following:
 State models including Turing machine, pushdown automaton, finite state automaton, and PRAM
 Functional models including lambda calculus
 Logical models including logic programming
 Concurrent models including actor model and process calculi
Giunti calls the models studied by computation theory computational systems, and he argues that all of them are mathematical dynamical systems with discrete time and discrete state space. He maintains that a computational system is a complex object which consists of three parts. First, a mathematical dynamical system  with discrete time and discrete state space; second, a computational setup , which is made up of a theoretical part , and a real part ; third, an  interpretation , which links the dynamical system  with the setup .

See also 
 Computationalism
 Real computation
 Reversible computation
 Hypercomputation
 Lateral computing
 Computational problem
 Multiple realizability
 Limits of computation

References

Theoretical computer science
Computability theory